Peter Kayafas (born 1971) is an American photographer, publisher, and educator based in New York City. He creates black and white photographs that are "simple and spare, yet quietly overpowering with their evocation of a history on a scale beyond that of individual human lives."
 
Kayafas is the Director of the Eakins Press Foundation and is a Guggenheim Fellow in photography. He is Co-Chair of the Board of Directors of the Corporation of Yaddo and was an adjunct associate professor of photography at Pratt Institute for 21 years.
 
Kayafas's photographs are in the collections of the Museum of Modern Art, the Art Institute of Chicago, the New York Public Library, New Orleans Museum of Art,  the Brooklyn Museum of Art, the RISD Museum, and SFMOMA, and there are five monographs of his photographs in print.

Life and work

Early work
Peter Kayafas was born in Boston in 1971 and raised in Concord, Massachusetts. His father, Gus Kayafas, founded the undergraduate photography program at Massachusetts College of Art, and his mother Arlette Kayafas, is the founder and owner of celebrated Boston gallery, Gallery Kayafas. He moved to New York City in 1989 to study photography at New York University's Tisch School of the Arts, from which he received a BFA in 1993. During his college years, he worked as a printer for Rosalind Fox Solomon and Sylvia Plachy, and studied with Nan Goldin, Anthony Barboza, and A. D. Coleman. Kayafas spent the summer and fall of 1991 in San Francisco where he did an independent study with Henry Wessel, Jr. at the San Francisco Art Institute, and worked for Andy Grundberg at the Friends of Photography. In 1990, he met and began working for Leslie George Katz, founder and publisher of the Eakins Press. In 1993, Katz appointed Kayafas the Director of the press, a position he has continued for three decades.

Professional life
Peter Kayafas's photographs have been published in five monographs: Peter Kayafas: Coney Island Waterdance (2021), Peter Kayafas: The Way West (2020), Totems (2012), O Public Road! Photographs of America (2009), and The Merry Cemetery of Sapanta (2007). His photographs have also been published in various magazines and journals—including DoubleTake Magazine and The Southern Review—as well as in photography books, including Bystander: A History of Street Photography (2001 and 2017), and The Spirit of Family by Al Gore and Tipper Gore (2002). Kayafas has had numerous solo exhibitions in New York City and Boston, most notably at Sasha Wolf Gallery. Kayafas has given lectures at dozens of venues, including Aperture, Bard College, Boston University, the Harry Ransom Center, and Pratt Institute. In 2018 he became Co-Chair of the Board of Directors of the Corporation of Yaddo. In 2019, Kayafas was awarded the prestigious Guggenheim Fellowship for photography.
 
As a publisher and editor running the Eakins Press Foundation for three decades, Kayafas has produced celebrated books by some of the most world-renowned photographers, including Walker Evans, Lee Friedlander, and Stephen Shore. He has been teaching photography at Pratt Institute since 2000, and has been represented by Sasha Wolf Projects since 2003.

Coney Island Waterdance 
Coney Island Waterdance is a collection of photographs by Peter Kayafas taken between the years of 1991 and 2002, which depicts swimmers in the summertime as well as the Polar Bear Club in the winter. Kayafas was the first photographer to join the Polar Bear Club in the water to photograph them. The collection of photographs was featured in The Southern Review. A book featuring this work was published in 2021 by Purple Martin Press.

Cuba 
Kayafas travelled to Cuba in 2000 and 2001. The New Yorker called his Cuba photographs “crisp and direct, and the best of them vibrate with understated graphic tension.” Kayafas's pictures from Cuba were featured in DoubleTake Magazine (Winter 2002) and in the exhibition: Two Views of Cuba, with photographer Lou Jones, at the DeCordova Museum in Lincoln, Massachusetts in 2002.

Romania 
Romania is a collection of photographs that was made during several trips to Romania by Kayafas from 2003 to 2005. The collection was created by driving more than 10,000 kilometers and photographing the Romanian countryside and many Romanian cities. These photographs were exhibited at the Romanian Cultural Institute in New York City (2005) and the Romanian Embassy in Washington, DC (2006).

The Merry Cemetery of Sapanta 
Designed by the Dutch designer Tessa van der Waals and produced in Holland in 2007, The Merry Cemetery of Sapanta is a book about the carved graves in the remote Merry Cemetery. There are photographs of the colorful tombstones and their respective epitaphs, with translations by Adrian Sahlean. The book also includes an essay by the Romanian scholar Sanda Golopentia. These photographs were exhibited at the Romanian Cultural Institute in New York City (2005) and the Romanian Embassy in Washington, DC (2006).

People In New York 
Published in coordination with the Sasha Wolf Gallery in 2004, People In New York is an exhibition catalogue that includes a selection of 13 photographs by Peter Kayafas of people on the streets and in the parks of New York City. The book includes a short essay on that common occurrence in the city: the familiar glance from a stranger.

O Public Road! 
O Public Road! Photographs of America is a 2009 book of photographs published by Purple Martin Press. It features 160 pages of black and white photographs of landscapes, road signs, and people made by Peter Kayafas during two decades of road trips across America. The book includes an essay by Allan Gurganus and a song by Eef Barzelay.

Totems 
Totems is an exhibition and publication project by American photographer Peter Kayafas that consists of photographs of abandoned buildings in the west that The New Yorker said “have both sculptural presence and a symbolic weight.” The book Totems is a 2012 monograph by Kayafas, with an essay by renowned art critic, Jed Perl. Selections from Totems have been exhibited to critical acclaim in solo exhibitions in New York and New England in 2011 and 2012. Of the Totems photographs, Perl writes: “Kayafas's explorations of an endangered vernacular architecture are at once straightforward records and unabashedly poetic meditations, a matter of the photographer testing the quality of his attentiveness against the facts on the ground. The lyric impulse is sharpened by the documentary convention.”

Mexico City 
Mexico City is a collection of photographs that were made by Kayafas between 2012 and 2016. Since more than half of Mexico City's 21 million people are under twenty-five, Kayafas chose to focus on various rituals of the youth sub-culture that are prevalent in many parts of the city.

The Way West 
The Way West is a photographic project by Peter Kayafas that includes exhibitions and a monograph. The book, Peter Kayafas: The Way West, is the third monograph of Kayafas's work photographing along the roads of the United States, released in 2020. It includes an essay by acclaimed writer, Rick Bass, as well as images from ten years and thousands of miles of travel in the Plains States of Idaho, Montana, Wyoming, North Dakota, South Dakota, Nebraska, Oklahoma, and Colorado. According to a review of the book in Hyperallergic from April 14, 2020: “Kayafas has come back with what surely constitutes one of the most exhaustive, vivid photographic studies of a region to be produced anywhere in recent decades.”

Notable exhibitions

Solo exhibitions 
 Peter Kayafas: Selected Southern Photographs, Gallery Luisotti, Santa Monica, CA, 2000
 ‘O Public Road’: Photographs by Peter Kayafas, Public Policy Research Center, University of Missouri, Saint Louis, 2001
 Two Views of Cuba: Photographs by Lou Jones & Peter Kayafas, the Decordova Museum and Sculpture Park, Lincoln, MA, 2002
 People in New York: Photographs by Peter Kayafas, Sasha Wolf Photographs, New York, 2004
 Romania: Photographs by Peter Kayafas, Sasha Wolf Photographs, New York, 2004
 Peter Kayafas: Selected Photographs, 1992-2004, Gallery Kayafas, Boston, 2005
 The Merry Cemetery of Sapanta and Selected Photographs of Romania, the Romanian Cultural Institute, New York, 2005
 An American in Romania: Photographs by Peter Kayafas, the Romanian Embassy, Washington, Dc, May 4-June 4, 2006
 Road Trips: Photographs by Gus Kayafas & Peter Kayafas, Tremaine Gallery Hotchkiss School, September 6-October 21, 2006
 Peter Kayafas: Recent Photographs of America, Sasha Wolf Gallery, New York, January 10-March 1, 2008
 Peter Kayafas: Recent Photographs of America, Sasha Wolf Gallery, New York, January 10-March 1, 2008
 The Merry Cemetery of Sapanta, Photographs by Peter Kayafas, Gallery Kayafas, Boston, June 11-July 26, 2008
 Peter Kayafas: Totems, Sasha Wolf Gallery, New York, May 25-July 16, 2011
 Peter Kayafas: Totems, Gallery Kayafas, Boston, January 13-February 25, 2012
 The Way West: Photographs by Peter Kayafas, Sasha Wolf Gallery, New York, April 30-June 7, 2014
 Peter Kayafas: Ecos, Universidad Del Claustro De Sor Juana, Mexico City, March 30-May 20, 2016
 Coming of Age in the West, Photographs by Peter Kayafas, the Century Association, New York, March 23-April 28, 2017
 Peter Kayafas & Paul Mcdonough: The Spirit of America, Sarah Shepard Gallery, Larkspur, California, January 25-March 2, 2019
 Peter Kayafas: The Way West, Gallery Kayafas, Boston, Massachusetts, March 6-April 11, 2020

Group exhibitions 
 Straight Arrows (Group Show), Ariel Meyerowitz Gallery, New York, 2001
 The Sidewalk Never Ends (Group Show), Art Institute of Chicago, 2002
 Alone: Images of Isolation from the Permanent Collection (Group Show), the DeCordova Museum and Sculpture Park, Lincoln, MA, 2002
 Gotham: Photographs of New York (Group Show), Fitchburg Art Museum, Fitchburg, MA, 2002
 The ‘ing’ Show: A Group Show, Ariel Meyerowitz Gallery, New York, 2003
 Wild Flowers: A Group Show, Ariel Meyerowitz Gallery, New York, 2004
 Still Life & Stilled Lives: A Group Show, Ariel Meyerowitz Gallery, New York, 2005
 Vernacular Territory: Photographs by George Tice, Kate Schermerhorn & Peter Kayafas, Ariel Meyerowitz Gallery, New York, 2005
 Adieu: A Farewell Exhibition (Group Show), Ariel Meyerowitz Gallery, New York, 2005
 Sasha Wolf Photographs at Gitterman Gallery: Photographs by Peter Kayafas, Eric Lewandowski, Alan Chin, Yola Monakhov, and Adam Schrieber, Gitterman Gallery, New York, July 25-August 19, 2006
 Place and Time (Group Show), the Demenil Gallery, the Groton School, Groton Massachusetts, September 24-November 11, 2007
 Moving Through New England (Group Show), the Decordova Museum, Lincoln, Massachusetts, October 6, 2007-September, 2007
 Photographs of Children from the Permanent Collection (Group Show), the DeCordova Museum and Sculpture Park, Lincoln, Massachusetts February 2-April 27, 2008
 In Our Dreams (Group Show), Sasha Wolf Gallery, New York, June 26-August 9, 2008
 Signs: Wordplay in Photography (Group Show), De Young Museum, San Francisco, Ca., January 17- June 14, 2009
 Paul Mcdonough & Peter Kayafas Photographs, Gallery Fiol, Palma De Majorca, Spain, June 17-July 31, 2010
 Residents & Visitors: 20th Century Photographs of Louisiana (Group Show), New Orleans Museum of Art, November, 2011
 AIPAD Photography Show (Sasha Wolf Gallery) (Group Show), the Armory, New York, March 28-April 1, 2012
 Intra Country: Patriotic Expressions (Group Show), Gallery Kayafas, Boston, July 6-August 11, 2012
 Group Show: An Introduction, Sasha Wolf Gallery, New York, December 4, 2012 – January 13, 2013
 AIPAD Photography Show (Sasha Wolf Gallery) (Group Show), the Armory, New York, April 3-April 6, 2103
 Group Exhibition: The Drinking Show, Sasha Wolf Gallery, New York, July 10-August 16, 2013
 Romeo & Juliet in Pictures: A Group Show, Sasha Wolf Gallery, New York, June 18-August 10, 2014
 New York: Three Views, Peter Kayafas, Aaron Rose, Lynn Saville, Gallery Kayafas, Boston, January 22-February 27, 2016
 Trees II (Group Show), Gallery Kayafas, Boston, June 8-July 28, 2018
 The Collected Image: Photography Portfolios, Fitchburg Art Museum, Fitchburg, Massachusetts, October 6, 2018 – August 18, 2019
 Unlimited: Recent Gifts from the William Goodman and Victoria Belco Photography Collection (Group Show Curated by Sandra Phillips), UC Berkeley Art Museum and Pacific Rim Archive, Berkeley, California, March 27-September 1, 2019

Collections
Kayafas's work is held in the following public collections:
Art Institute of Chicago, Chicago, IL
Brooklyn Museum of Art, Brooklyn, NY
DeCordova Museum, Lincoln, MA
Fidelity, Boston, MA
Joy of Giving Something (Dreyfus) Collection
Museum of the City of New York, NY
Museum of Modern Art, New York, NY
Nevada Museum of Art, Reno, NV
New Orleans Museum of Art, New Orleans, LA
New York Public Library, New York, NY
Rhode Island School of Design Museum, Providence, RI
San Francisco Museum of Modern Art, San Francisco, CA
UC Berkeley Art Museum, Berkeley, CA

Publications

Books 
 
 
 
 
 
 
 Kayafas, Peter; (2021) Coney Island Waterdance New York, NY: Purple Martin Press ISBN 978-0-97977-684-7

Other publications 
 The Spirit of Family, Albert and Tipper Gore. Holt, 2002
 Lincoln Kirstein: A Bibliography of Published Writings, edited by Peter Kayafas. Eakins Press Foundation, New York, 2007
 CIRCUS: The Photographs of Frederick W. Glasier, edited by Peter Kayafas & Deborah W. Walk. Eakins Press Foundation, New York, 2009
 “Coney Island Waterdance,” The Southern Review, Spring 2012
 THE AMERICANS LIST: By the Glow of the Jukebox (contributor), Red Hook Editions, Brooklyn, 2012
 “Mexico City: Hope is a Kiss,” The Baffler No. 22, pages 17–19, April, 2013
 “A Treasure in Our Midst: The Great Circus Photographs of Frederick W. Glasier,” by Peter Kayafas, Cigar City Magazine, pages 24–31, Fall 2013
 LEE FRIEDLANDER: THE PRINTED PICTURE. Edited by Stephen Hilger and Peter Kayafas, The Pratt Photography Department and Libraries and Eakins Press Foundation, Brooklyn and New York, 2014
 ‘O, Write My Name’: American Portraits, Harlem Heroes, Photographs by Carl Van Vecthen, Edited by Leslie George Katz and Peter Kayafas, Eakins Press Foundation, New York, 2015.
 PETER KAYAFAS: ECOS (exhibition catalogue), Universidad del Claustro de Sor Juana, Mexico City, 2016.
 “Review of The Hour of Land by Terry Tempest Williams”, Aperture Magazine Photobook Review, November, 2016.
 Pilgrimage: Photographs by Mary Frank. Edited and sequenced by Mary Frank and Peter Kayafas, Eakins Press Foundation, New York, 2017.
 Bystander: A History of Street Photography, Joel Meyerowitz and Colin Westerbeck. Laurence King. London, 2017.
 Stephen Shore: Elements, Edited and sequenced by Stephen Shore and Peter Kayafas, Eakins Press Foundation, New York, 2019.
 PhotoWork: Forty Photographers on Process and Practice, Edited by Sasha Wolf. Aperture, New York, 2019.
 Object Lesson: On the Influence of Richard Benson. (Contributor) Aperture, New York, NY 2022

References

External links
Official website
Peter Kayafas on Sasha Wolf Projects

21st-century American photographers
Street photographers
Photographers from New York City
1971 births
Living people
21st-century American male artists